San Bernardino (also, Rancho San Bernardino) is a village in Sonora, Mexico.

References

Populated places in Sonora